Lake Britton is a reservoir located in Shasta County, California. It is known for its wide variety of bass and trout. Its main body is situated to the west of State Route 89, and is mostly surrounded by PG&E Land, Forest Service Land, and McArthur-Burney Falls Memorial State Park.  Along the north shore lies North Shore and Dusty Campgrounds. It is fed by the Pit River and has tributaries of Clark Creek, Burney Creek, and Hat Creek and is impounded by the Pit #3 Dam.

A bridge, owned by the Great Shasta Rail Trail, which spans Lake Britton (just east of Hwy 89) was used for the railroad bridge scene in the 1986 film Stand By Me.

See also 
 List of lakes in California

References

External links 

Britton
Shasta-Trinity National Forest
Britton
Britton